Craig Francis Cullinan Jr. (May 17, 1925 – March 17, 2004) was an American oilman from Texas and baseball executive. He served as Chairman of the Executive Committee of the Houston Sports Association, the founding group of thirty members that acquired the Houston Astros Major League Baseball franchise rights. Originally named the Houston Colt .45's, Cullinan Jr. served as the team's first president.

Biography
Born to Craig F. Cullinan Sr. and Edith Cullinan (née Phillips) on May 17, 1925 in Houston, Texas, his grandfather, Joseph S. Cullinan, founded The Texas Fuel Company in 1902 which would eventually be known as Texaco.

After completing high school at Phillips Exeter Academy in 1942, Craig Cullinan Jr. served as an ensign in the United States Navy Reserve during World War II. When the war ended, he entered Yale University, where he was a member of the Wolf's Head Society, graduating in the Class of 1949.

Cullinan died in 2004, leaving behind one child and three grandchildren.

Baseball career
Cullinan was convinced by George Kirksey to show interest in baseball for Houston. In 1957, Cullinan, Kirskey, and Bill Kirkland formed the Houston Sports Association. For his efforts, he was honored with a lifetime achievement award by the Houston sports writers in 2001.

Thoroughbred racing
Craig Cullinan Jr. owned and raced a number of Thoroughbred racehorses, the most successful of which was King's Bishop.

References

1925 births
2004 deaths
Phillips Exeter Academy alumni
Yale University alumni
United States Navy reservists
Houston Colt .45s executives
Major League Baseball team presidents
Houston Astros executives
American racehorse owners and breeders
American newspaper editors
Businesspeople from Houston
20th-century American businesspeople
Burials at Glenwood Cemetery (Houston, Texas)
United States Navy personnel of World War II
United States Navy officers